Mon Amour, Mon Parapluie is a short film directed by Giada Dobrzenska and featuring cameo appearances by William Gibson and Douglas Coupland. The film was nominated for nine categories of British Columbia's Leo Awards, including one to Studio X for sound editing. It was an official 2007 selection at Big Sur International Film Festival.

Described as a 'timeless visual poem', the story centres around a young woman (played by Tara Hungerford) who loses her umbrella in a café. The incident alters her perception of the world, bringing with it an acceptance of loss and change. The film's music was composed by Nicholas Lloyd-Webber, son of Andrew Lloyd-Webber.

The film was featured as part of the Rendez-Vous du Cinéma Québécois et Francophone 2008 programme at the Vancouver International Film Centre. A still image from the film was featured at a Heritage Vancouver Long Table Social Series in April 2010, a series connecting Vancouver's visual arts with its heritage structures. In 2015, Women in Film and Television Vancouver included the film as part of its 25th Anniversary Retrospective.

References

External links
 

Canadian drama short films
Films shot in British Columbia
2000s English-language films
2000s Canadian films